Lucifer is a religious figure, usually popularly associated with Satan. 

Lucifer may also refer to:

Astronomy 
 Lucifer, the ancient Roman name for the planet Venus; see Venus in culture
 1930 Lucifer, an asteroid

People 
 Lucifer of Cagliari (d. May 20, 370 or 371), bishop of Cagliari (353–370/371), named after 2 Peter 1:19 Latin title for Christ
 Lucifer of Siena (c. 306), first bishop of Siena, named after 2 Peter 1:19 Latin title for Christ
 Lucifer (wrestler), ring name of professional wrestler Tim Burke (1960–2011)
 "Lucifer", pseudonym used by composer Mort Garson for his 1971 album Black Mass
 "Lucifer", an alias used by Dunk Rock, vocalist for the band UFX
 Hendrick Lucifer (1583–1627), famous pirate and brute

Arts, entertainment, and media

Art
Lucifer, 1945 bronze statue in entrance hall of Birmingham Museum and Art Gallery by Sir Jacob Epstein.
 Le génie du mal, known informally in English as Lucifer or The Lucifer of Liège, 1848 religious sculpture executed in white marble
 Lucifer (Stuck), an 1890 painting by Franz Stuck

Books, literature and periodicals

 Lucifer (magazine), a journal published by Helena Blavatsky
 Lucifer, a play written by Joost van den Vondel in the 17th century, about the fallen angel
 "Lucifer," a 1964 short story by Roger Zelazny from The Doors of His Face, The Lamps of His Mouth, and Other Stories
 I, Lucifer, a 2003 novel by Glen Duncan
 Lucifer the Lightbearer, an anarchist journal 1803-1906 by Moses Harman
 Lucifer (comics), with several meanings

Film and TV
 Lucifer (1921 film), lost 1921 Austrian film with Anita Berber
 Lucifer (2019 Indian film), a 2019 Indian Malayalam film
 Lucifer (2019 Nigerian film)
 Luzifer (film) 2021 Austrian film
 Lucifer (South Korean TV series), a 2007 television series
 Lucifer (TV series), a 2016 American Fox/Netflix television series

Fictional characters
 Lucifer (Battlestar Galactica), a Cylon character in Battlestar Galactica
 Lucifer (Cinderella), the family cat in Disney's animated movie Cinderella
 Lucifer, a character in the video game DemiKids
 Lucifer, a character in Supernatural
Lucifer (DC Comics), a character by DC Comics and the protagonist of the TV series Lucifer

Music

Groups
 Lucifer (multinational band), a multinational (Swedish/German) heavy metal band formed in 2014
 Lucifer (British band), a British solo rock project formed in 1972
 Lucifer (Japanese band), a Japanese rock band formed in 1999
 Lucifer, a 1970s Detroit soul/jazz group signed to Invictus Records

Albums
 Lucifer (Kenny Barron album), a 1975 album by jazz pianist Kenny Barron
 Lucifer, a 2003 album by Of the Wand & the Moon
 Lucifer (Shinee album), a 2010 album
 Lucifer, a 2012 album by Peaking Lights
 Lucifer: Book of Angels Volume 10, a 2008 album by the Bar Kokhba Sextet composed by John Zorn

Songs
 "Lucifer" (Bob Seger song), a 1970 song
 "Lucifer" (Blue System song), a 1991 single
 "Lucifer" (Shinee song), a 2010 promotional single
 "Lucifer", an instrumental title from the 1979 album Eve by The Alan Parsons Project
 "Lucifer", a 2003 hip-hop song by Jay-Z from The Black Album
 "Lucifer", a 2007 single by Blutengel from Labyrinth
 "Lucifer", a 2009 song Behemoth from Evangelion
 "Lucifer", a 2015 song by XOV

Science and technology 
 Lucifer (cipher), a block cipher which was the forerunner to DES
 Lucifer (crustacean), a genus of sea life
 LUCIFER, the Large Binocular Telescope in southeastern Arizona, United States

Other uses 
 Lucifer, an obsolete word for matches, especially the non-safety type tipped with potassium chlorate and antimony sulphide

See also 
 Lucifer Hill, a mountain
 Lucifer Peak, a mountain in Canada
 Lucifer Rising (film)
 Lucifera (comics), an Italian comic character
 Lucifera Demon Lover, a film
 Luciferase, a bioluminescent enzyme
 Luciferin, a generic term for the light-emitting compound found in organisms that generate bioluminescence
 Luciferianism, a system of beliefs